Veronica Freeman, also known by her stage name "The V" (born December 17, 1977), is the lead vocalist of American heavy metal band Benedictum. Her most recent album with Benedictum is Obey, released through Frontiers Records in 2013. On July 10, 2015 (July 3, in Europe), Frontiers Records will release Freeman's debut solo album, Now or Never, which includes two songs written and produced by Stryper frontman, Michael Sweet.

Biography
When she was introduced to metal she felt in love with the power and the energy of it and was encouraged to try singing by her longtime friend Craig Goldy. Freeman and Pete Wells became close friends and she has said that there is something about his playing that inspires her to this day. They started writing together and were in a few bands together, including Medusa and the Malady.
They felt that after playing quite a few local shows in San Diego that it was time to move forward and see what they could do musically on a new level and that is when they embarked on the project that is now Benedictum. With some help from Craig they were introduced to the musician Jeff Pilson, who helped promote the group. Freeman got married in 2007.

In July 2015, Freeman as The V, will release her debut solo album, Now or Never, which features numerous guest appearances including Michael Sweet as writer and producer on the tracks, "Again" and "Love Should Be to Blame"; Tony Martin as vocalist on "King For a Day", and Chastain vocalist, Leather Leone on "Kiss My Lips".

Influences
Her influences include Ronnie James Dio, Tina Turner, Melissa Etheridge, Etta James, Billie Holiday, Sarah Vaughan and Freddie Mercury.

Discography
With Benedictum

 Uncreation (2006)
  Seasons of Tragedy (2008) 
  Dominion (2011) 
  Obey (2013) 

As The V
Now or Never (2015)

Albums (guest sessions)
Grave Digger
 Ballads of a Hangman (2009)

A Sound of Thunder
 Queen of Hell (2013) (duet vocals on title track)

Vastator
 Machine Hell (2010)

Lyraka
 Lyraka Volume 1 (2010)
 Lyraka Volume 2 (2012)

References

External links
 

1977 births
American heavy metal singers
American women heavy metal singers
Living people
Musicians from San Diego
Singers from California
21st-century American singers
21st-century American women singers